A polar bear plunge is an event held during the winter where participants enter a body of water despite the low temperature. In the United States, polar bear plunges are usually held to raise money for a charitable organization. In Canada, polar bear swims are usually held on New Year's Day to celebrate the new year.

Canada
In Canada, "Polar Bear Swims", "plunges" or "dips" are a New Year's Day tradition in numerous communities across the country. Vancouver, BC's annual Polar Bear Swim Club has been active since 1920 and typically has 1,000 to 2,000 registered participants, with a record 2,128 plunging into English Bay in 2000. Registration is not enforced and the actual number of swimmers may be significantly higher. Estimates of the number of observers are typically up to 10,000. Suburban White Rock, BC's was founded in 1958, and other suburbs including North Vancouver, Surrey, Delta and Langley also hold swims.

Other locations include Bowen Island, BC, Sidney, BC,Edmonton, AB, Calgary, AB, Ottawa, ON, Oakville, ON, Toronto, ON, Perth, ON, Clarington, ON, Sarnia, ON, Montreal, QC, North Hatley, QC, Halifax, NS, Prince Edward Island, Ness Lake north of Prince George, BC and St. John's, NL. In Yellowknife, NWT, the "Freezin for a Reason" plunge is held in May after the spring thaw.

Netherlands

Every New Year's Day around 10,000 people dive collectively into the icy cold sea water at Scheveningen, a Dutch beach resort town, since 1960. In 89 locations on beaches and in lakes all over the country, each year around 30,000 people participate in this "Nieuwjaarsduik" (English: New Year's dive), with a record 36,000 participants on January 1, 2012. Since 1998, Unox, a Unilever food brand often associated with winter, adopted the Nieuwjaarsduik and ever since it is tradition to wear Unox branded winter caps and gloves.

New Zealand
Polar plunges (the local name) are held at various beaches in New Zealand, usually on the weekend closest to the shortest day in late June. Among other places, polar plunges are led at Papamoa Beach (Tauranga), Saint Clair Beach (Dunedin), and Castlecliff (Wanganui).

United Kingdom

In the UK, the majority of winter swimming events take place on Christmas Day or Boxing Day, with many hundreds of people swimming in the sea at the largest events in Exmouth, Lowestoft and Brighton.

An annual "Loony Dook" takes place in South Queensferry, Scotland, on New Year's Day. Several thousand attend the event with over one thousand taking the plunge. Participants regularly dress up for the occasion and will usually parade through the local town acting like "loonies" proceeding the "dook". Aside from the regular enthusiasts, most are still inebriated from New Year's Eve celebrations and have more than likely lost a bet.

Another, smaller plunge occurs on Christmas Day at Blackroot Pool in Sutton Park, Birmingham, England. Often, participants aim to raise money for charity.

There is a Christmas Day Harbour Swim in Weymouth, Dorset

In the British Overseas Territory of Gibraltar, an annual swim is held on Boxing Day.

Since the event's inauguration in 1983, thousands of people have taken part in the annual New Year's Day Dip on the Isle of Man, a British Crown Dependency. Events are held in Peel, Laxey, Douglas, Port St Mary, Ramsey and Castletown for various charities.

United States

Polar plunges are held across the United States. Annual events are held in Seattle (since 1993); Evergreen, Colorado; New York (the Coney Island Polar Bear Club); Lake George, NY;
Boston (since 1904); Milwaukee's Bradford Beach (since 1916); New Hampshire; and New Jersey. Some, such as Minnesota's, are held to raise proceeds for the Special Olympics. Geisel School of Medicine at Dartmouth College also organizes an annual "Polar Plunge for Health Equity" into Occom Pond.

The Polar Bear Plunge event in Maryland is the largest polar bear plunge in the United States. It is held annually at Sandy Point State Park and raises funds for the Special Olympics. Sponsored by the Maryland State Police, in 2007, Plungapalooza raised $2.2 million and had 7,400 participants. In 2008, an estimated 12,000 people participated.

Every Super Bowl Sunday, Long Beach, New York, hosts one of the largest in the US. Since 1998 thousands of people have flocked to the beaches of Long Beach to jump into the ocean on Super Bowl Sunday.  All proceeds are donated to the Make-A-Wish Foundation.

From February to March each year, Polar Plunges are held in numerous locations throughout the state of Illinois.  Donations and proceeds raised for the Special Olympics.

South Korea

An annual Polar Bear Swimming Contest takes place annually at the Haeundae Beach in Busan, South Korea.

Midsummer polar plunge (Antarctica)
A polar plunge is also held every midsummer in Antarctica – a rite of passage for scientists and visitors to New Zealand's Scott Base. It is held in late December.

See also
Ice swimming
Ice bath
Ice bucket challenge

 Winter swimming

References

Further reading

External links

Open water swimming
Winter traditions
New Year celebrations
January events
June events
Fundraising events